The 1976 Ahearne Cup was the 24th edition of the Ahearne Cup ice hockey tournament. Six teams participated in the tournament, which was won by HC Dynamo Moscow of the Soviet Union. It was held from December 26–30, 1975, in Stockholm, Sweden.

Results

External links
Tournament on hockeyarchives.info

1976
1975–76 in Soviet ice hockey
1975–76 in Swedish ice hockey
1975–76 in Czechoslovak ice hockey